The 3rd Gran Premio di Modena was a Formula Two motor race held on 14 September 1952 at the Autodromo di Modena, Italy. The race was run over 100 laps of the circuit, and was won by Italian driver Luigi Villoresi in a Ferrari 500 in a near dead-heat with José Froilán González in a Maserati A6GCM. Villoresi and Gonzalez shared fastest lap. Sergio Sighinolfi and Alberto Ascari shared third place in a Ferrari 500. Ascari had started from pole but retired with mechanical problems, and took over Sighinolfi's car.

Classification

References

Modena Grand Prix
Modena Grand Prix
Modena Grand Prix